Sporting Club Bastiais (commonly referred to as SC Bastia or simply Bastia) is a French association football club based in Bastia on the island of Corsica. The club plays in Ligue 2, the second tier of French football, having won the 2020–21 Championnat National. The club plays its home matches at the Stade Armand Cesari located within the city. SC Bastia is known for its strong association with Corsican nationalism.

Bastia's main historical success include reaching the final of the 1977–78 edition of the UEFA Cup. The team was defeated by Dutch club PSV Eindhoven (0–0 at home, 0–3 away). Domestically, Bastia won the second division of French football in 1968 and 2012, and the Coupe de France in 1981. During the club's infancy, it was league champions of the "Corsican League" 17 times. They are the local rivals of Ajaccio and contest the Derby Corse.

The club has signed several famous players in its history, notably including Dragan Džajić, Claude Papi, Johnny Rep, Roger Milla, Michael Essien, Alex Song, Sébastien Squillaci, Jérôme Rothen, Antar Yahia and Florian Thauvin.

In 2017 the club was relegated to the Championnat National 3 due to financial irregularities and lost its professional licence; therefore, the official name was changed from Sporting Club de Bastia to Sporting Club Bastiais. I Turchini regained professional status in 2021 following promotion to Ligue 2.

History

Genesis of the team and beginning of professional football 

Sporting Club de Bastia was founded in 1905 by a Swiss named Hans Ruesch. He taught German in high school in Bastia. The first president of Bastia was Emile Brandizi. The Corsican club celebrated its debut on the Place d'Armes of Bastia, in the light of a single gas burner.

The club began its professional journey in 1965, in Division 2. After three successful seasons, it was crowned Champion of France's Second Division in 1968, joining the elite. The first season was difficult, but the club still maintained its place. Thus began a decade widely considered the finest in club history. In 1972, the club reached, for the first time, the final of the Coupe de France against Olympique de Marseille (losing 2–1), getting it its first qualification in the European Cup Winners' Cup, which led to elimination against the excellent team of Atlético Madrid.

UEFA Cup finalist in 1978 and Cup victory in France in 1981 
In 1977, Bastia finished third in the Division 1 with the best offence in the league, with magnificent Dragan Džajić as a left winger
 and qualified for the UEFA Cup.

This is the beginning of the team built around playmaker Claude Papi, which was composed of many talented players such as Johnny Rep of the Netherlands; Jean-François Larios, a midfielder and French international; and Charles Orlanducci, the solid libero nicknamed the "Lion of Vescovato".

The team eliminated successively Sporting Lisbon, Newcastle United, Torino, Carl Zeiss Jena and Grasshoppers Zurich before a final defeat to PSV Eindhoven (0–0, 0–3). Of all the victories, the 3–2 win in Turin made the most lasting impression, the "Toro" being undefeated for two seasons on their home pitch. It is also during this match that Bastia marks the best goal of that time, a volley from 22 meters by Jean-François Larios.

The final would, however, end with misfortune. First, with a first leg played at Furiani on an unplayable pitch, heavy rain having fallen on Corsica on 26 April 1978. Unfortunately, the Yugoslav referee postponed the meeting because of the proximity to World Cup in Argentina that was scheduled a few weeks later. Despite Bastia's dominance, the meeting ended with a goalless draw, 0–0.
The final return, 9 May, lasted only 24 minutes. This is the time it took Eindhoven to score the first goal, followed by two more late in the game (3–0). The townsfolk will attribute the defeat of Bastia to fatigue accumulated in the league (3 games in 6 days in the days before the final return) and also the rain-soaked pitch in the first leg at Furiani.

Bastia then realised the greatest moment in Corsican sport (see the movie Forza Bastia of Jacques Tati). The ECBC club, from a town of only 40,000 souls, had done more than challenge the major capitals of European football: it had allowed the whole of Corsica to meet, at a time when the nationalist movement was born, three years after the episode of Bastia, in 1975.

Three years after that final, the Bastia won its first trophy with the Coupe de France 1980–81. This was a prestigious victory for the Corsican club facing St. Etienne of Michel Platini. The final was played at Parc des Princes in front of more than 46,000 spectators, including the newly elected President of the Republic, François Mitterrand.

Descent in Division 2 and Furiani disaster 

After 18 years in the elite, the club went down to the second division at the end of the 1985–86 season, and stayed for eight years. This era is marked by the catastrophe of Furiani: In the 1991–92 season, the club reached the semi-finals of the Coupe de France. The match was played at Stade Armand Cesari, or "Furiani Stadium", against Olympique de Marseille which dominated the Championship of France. The enthusiasm was such that was decided to hastily construct a temporary stand of 10,000 seats. The upper part of the platform collapsed a few minutes before kick-off killing 18 and injuring 2,300.

Back in Ligue 1 and in the European Cup 
The club returned to the elite for the 1994–95 season and that year reached the final of the League Cup. This era was marked by the work of Frédéric Antonetti, who coached the club between 1990 and 1994 and oversaw the development of new talents (Morlaye Soumah, Laurent Casanova, and Cyril Rool).

Antonetti coached the first team from 1994 to 2001 (with an interlude in 1998–99) and was involved in the recruitment of players such as Lubomir Moravcik, Pierre-Yves André, Frédéric Née, Franck Jurietti, and Anto Drobnjak, the latter of whom was the club's top scorer in his third season. At the end of the 1995–96 season, Drobnjak was also second in the Championship scoring charts with 20 goals, one goal behind top scorer Sonny Anderson.

In the 1996–97 season the club finished in 7th place in Ligue 1, just 3 points off the top, thus qualifying for the Intertoto Cup. The club won the Intertoto Cup, and qualified for the UEFA Cup for the 1997–98 season. Bastia eliminated Benfica in the round of 32 before falling to Steaua Bucharest in the next round. This defeat left a bitter taste due to the domination Bastia had in both matches. The performance of Bastia in the league in the following years allowed it to qualify two more times for the Intertoto Cup, in 1998 and 2001, but failed to re-qualify for the UEFA Cup.

After the departure of Antonetti in 2001, the club would not finish in the top ten again. They did reach the final of the Coupe de France in 2001–02; in their midfield was Michael Essien, who would go on to play for Lyon and Chelsea. Another player groomed by Bastia was defender Alex Song, who later played for Arsenal and Barcelona.

Between 2002 and 2005, Bastia was managed by Robert Nouzaret, Gerard Gili, François Ciccolini, and lastly the duo of Michel Padovani and Eric Durand. Each failed to take the team to the top ten, the final league placing actually falling each year (see Section championship history), despite the first team featuring the likes of Tony Vairelles, Florian Maurice, Franck Silvestre, Lilian Laslandes (all internationals) and Cyril Jeunechamp.

In the winter break of the 2004–05 season, the club fell into the relegation zone. Bastia recruited Christian Karembeu, member of the 1998 World Cup-winning France team, but Bastia would still be relegated to Ligue 2 at the end of the season after 11 consecutive years in Ligue 1.

The Descent Below 
In 2005, the club was relegated to Ligue 2. Five years later, Bastia was in serious danger of descent into the Championnat National. Bastia was officially relegated to the National on 7 May 2010, following a draw (0–0) with Tours at the 37th matchday of Ligue 2.

On 6 July 2010, the club was administratively relegated to Championnat de France amateur by the Direction Nationale du Contrôle de Gestion (DNCG). The club actually had a deficit of €1.2 million, which was filled by grants from local governments (Territorial Community of Corsica, the General Council of Haute-Corse). On 23 July 2010, the Federal Council of the French Football Federation authorised Bastia to play in the 2010–11 season, as requested by the National Olympic Committee and French sports (CNOSF) after the DNCG had refused.

Despite this disrupted pre-season, Bastia performed well in the transfer window, with no fewer than six rookies. As for departures, there is mainly the transfer of Florent Ghisolfi (Reims) and Christophe Gaffory (Vannes) as well as Pierre-Yves André who decided to end his career.

The rise in Ligue 2 

Faruk Hadžibegić's was fired from the coaching job after poor results, and the job passed instead to Frédéric Hantz. On 22 April 2011, Bastia officially earned its place in Ligue 2 after a game against Frejus-Saint Raphael. No fewer than 500 townsfolk had made the trip. On 7 May 2011, Bastia is the National champion, following a victory over Créteil by 2 goals to one, with Bastia finishing with a record tally of 91 points and unbeaten at home throughout the campaign. Sporting was leading at the half, but equalised by David Suarez, and Idrissa Sylla allowed Bastia to take the lead in the 92nd minute in a crazy atmosphere. At the end of the match, the pitch at Armand Cesari was invaded by Bastia fans, happy to celebrate with their players and their coach, Frédéric Hantz, this new title.

Return to Ligue 1 

Bastia, newly promoted from the National, welcomed Jérôme Rothen, Toifilou Maoulida, François Marque, Ludovic Genest and Florian Thauvin into the club. Bastia started off on a good note, falling off slightly in the autumn. From early February until the beginning of April, Bastia did not lose a single match. On 23 April 2012, in a full Stadium Armand Cesari, Bastia virtually secured their place amongst the elite by winning against Châteauroux (2–1). On 1 May 2012, Bastia became champion of Ligue 2, 44 years after its first and only league title, with their victory over Metz at Armand Cesari. On 11 May 2012, Bastia won its last game of the season at home 2–1 against Nantes thanks to goals from Jérôme Rothen and David Suarez. The club was also on a 2-year run of being undefeated at home. Bastia became part of the very exclusive club of teams undefeated at home in Europe. Several players played their last game against Nantes in the colours of Bastia, including David Suarez and Jacques-Désiré Périatambée.

Bastia won all the trophies UNFP for Ligue 2: Jérôme Rothen, best player; Macedo Novaes, best goalkeeper; and Frédéric Hantz, best coach, who placed five players in the team line-up (Macedo Novaes, Féthi Harek, Wahbi Khazri, Sadio Diallo and Jérôme Rothen).

In the 2016–17 Ligue 1 season, after four seasons in the top division, Bastia finished bottom of the Ligue 1 table and were relegated to Ligue 2.

Sharp fall, financial troubles and slow climb back 
On 22 June 2017, Bastia were relegated again to Championnat National after the DNCG had recommended a further demotion for the club.  Bastia were the subject of an audit on their books which resulted in yet another demotion for failing to guarantee they had the finances to compete in Ligue 2. The DNCG released a statement on the same day stating “Following its audit today before the DNCG, Sporting Club Bastia has been given notice of a provisional relegation". In August 2017, Bastia were demoted again to the Championnat National 3 following further financial irregularities.
The club gained promotion to the Championnat National 2 in the 2018–19 season, and completed a back-to-back promotion in the 2019–20 season, by being top of the National 2 Group A table when the season was curtailed due to the COVID-19 pandemic. Bastia achieved their third successive promotion after being assured of a top two finish in the 2020–21 Championnat National.

Stadium 

Stade Armand Cesari, also known as Stade Furiani, is the main football stadium in Corsica. It is located in Furiani, and is used by SC Bastia. In 1992, the stadium hosted the semi-finals of the Coupe de France during which a temporary grandstand collapsed, killing 18 people and injuring nearly 3,000.

Totally obsolete and even dangerous (barbed wire around the ground, dilapidated stands), the stadium hosted the 1978 UEFA Cup Final. The stadium's capacity was then less than 12,000 seats, in precarious conditions, heavy rain having fallen on Corsica that day, turning the ground into a quagmire, which handicapped the outcome of this decisive match (0–0). The crowd of 15,000 spectators announced appears exaggerated, but given the fervor around Corsica for the game, many fans did not hesitate to stand up, packed tightly, to attend the game. The record attendance at the stadium was set on 1 September 2012, when 15,505 people saw Bastia lose against St. Etienne (0–3) in a league match. Behind it the following record was set in 1978, when 15,000 people saw Bastia draw against PSV Eindhoven (0–0, 1978) in the UEFA Cup final matches.

Colours and badge 
For the 2011–12 season, the club decided to change the logo. This is the explanation; "1- Replacing the name "SCB". Spoken in the aisles of Armand Cesari since its inception. "Bastia" is the club of the city. 2- To recall the historic jersey from 1978, the shield has a moor's head, from the Testa Mora Flag. 3- It also reappeared as in the 70s and the heyday of the club. 4- The dominant color is blue. Always accompanied by white edging and black as official colours of the club since 1992."

Supporters 
Bastia has a large number of supporters among Corsicans, and their supporters frequently display elements of Corsican nationalism, such as the frequent use of the local language and symbols, and support for the island's independence. The fans are known as the Turchini, meaning "Blues" in Corsican.

The fans have a rivalry with most mainland supporters, however, their most fierce rivals are Nice with whom they contest the Derby de la Mediterranée, although the derby can also refer to rivalries with Marseille and Monaco. They also have a rivalry with Parisian club PSG due to political tensions between the capital and Corsica.

The other large rivalry is the Corsican derby with fellow islanders AC Ajaccio, and to a lesser extent Gazélec Ajaccio, with whom they compete over the dominance of the island.

Honours

Domestic 
Ligue 2
Winners: 1967–68, 2011–12

Championnat National
Winners: 2010–11, 2020–21

Coupe de France
Winners: 1980–81
Runners-up: 1971–72, 2001–02

Coupe de la Ligue
Runners-up: 1994–95, 2014–15

Trophée des champions
Winners: 1972

Corsica Championship
Winners (17): 1922, 1927, 1928, 1929, 1930, 1931, 1932, 1935, 1936, 1942, 1943, 1946, 1947, 1949, 1959, 1962, 1963

Europe 
UEFA Cup
Runners-up: 1977–78

Intertoto Cup
Champions: 1997

Players

Current squad

Reserve squad

Appearances 

Last update: 7 March 2017.Note: Bold represents current players.

Top scorers

French internationals

Coaching staff

Coaches 

  Boumedienne Abderrhamane (1957 – 1961)
 François Fassone (1961 – 1963)
 Gyula Nagy (1963 – 1964)
 André Strappe (1964 – 1965)
 Gyula Nagy (1965 – 1966)
 Lucien Jasseron (1966 – 1969)
 Rachid Mekhloufi (1969)
 Edmond Delfour and  Rachid Mekhloufi (1969 – 1970)
 Edmond Delfour (1970)
 Gyula Nagy (1970 – 1971)
 Jean Vincent (28 February 1971 – 31 October 1971)
 Pierre Cahuzac (1 November 1971 – 1979)
 Jean-Pierre Destrumelle (1979 – 1980)
 Antoine Redin (1980 – 1985)
 Alain Moizan (31 August 1985 – 30 November 1985)
 Antoine Redin (1 December 1985 – 1986)
 Roland Gransart (1986 – 1991)
 René Exbrayat (1991 – 1992)
 Léonce Lavagne (1992 – 1994)
 Frédéric Antonetti (2 October 1994 – 1998)
 Henryk Kasperczak (1998 – 18 October 1998)
 Laurent Fournier (19 October 1998 – 15 April 1999)
 José Pasqualetti (15 April 1999 – 30 June 1999)
 Frédéric Antonetti (1 July 1999 – 30 June 2001)
 Robert Nouzaret (1 July 2001 – 30 June 2002)
 Gérard Gili (1 July 2002 – 30 June 2004)
 François Ciccolini (1 July 2004 – 15 April 2005)
 Éric Durand and  Michel Padovani (15 April 2005 – 30 June 2005)
 Bernard Casoni (1 July 2005 – 30 June 2009)
 Philippe Anziani (1 July 2009 – 25 November 2009)
 Michel Padovani (25 November 2009 – 8 December 2009)
 Faruk Hadžibegić (8 December 2009 – 30 June 2010)
 Frédéric Hantz (1 July 2010 – 17 May 2014)
 Claude Makélélé (24 May 2014 – 3 November 2014)
 Ghislain Printant (3 November 2014 – 28 January 2016)
 François Ciccolini (28 January 2016 – 27 February 2017)
 Rui Almeida (27 February 2017 – 26 June 2017)
 Réginald Ray (26 June 2017 – 17 August 2017)
 Stéphane Rossi (17 August 2017 – 23 October 2019)
 Frédéric Née (interim) (24 October 2019 – 28 October 2019)
 Mathieu Chabert (28 October 2019 – 22 September 2021)
 Cyril Jeunechamp and  Frédéric Zago (interim) (22 September – )

References

External links 

Official website (in French)
Forza Bastia (in French)
Spiritu-Turchinu (in French)
The Guardian article

 
Association football clubs established in 1905
Football clubs in Corsica
Sport in Haute-Corse
1905 establishments in France
B
Ligue 1 clubs